Frankenstein is a 2004 American science fiction horror television film produced and directed by Marcus Nispel and written by John Shiban. It is a loose adaptation of Mary Shelley's Frankenstein, and stars Parker Posey as a police detective on the trail of a serial killer, played by Thomas Kretschmann, in present-day New Orleans. The detective is aided in her search by one of the killer's creations, played by Vincent Perez. Adam Goldberg, Ivana Miličević and Michael Madsen co-star. It was produced by Lions Gate Films, and aired on the USA Network on October 10, 2004.

The film was intended as the pilot for an ongoing series, and was initially based on Dean Koontz's version of Frankenstein. USA and the producers decided that major changes must be made and Koontz had no interest in the show in its new form. He withdrew from association with it and turned to the task of realizing the original concept of the book form. Subsequently, executive producer Martin Scorsese also expressed desire to exit the series. Koontz later developed the concept into a series of five novels: Frankenstein: Prodigal Son, Frankenstein: City of Night, Frankenstein: Dead and Alive, Frankenstein: Lost Souls, and Frankenstein: The Dead Town.

Premise
While investigating the murders of a serial killer who mutilates and removes the internal organs of the victims, two present-day New Orleans police detectives, Carson O'Conner and her partner Michael Sloane, learn that Victor Frankenstein, now calling himself Victor Helios, is still alive and has created a number of genetically-engineered creatures with the intent of building a legion of followers to assist in his overthrow of the Old Race (humans). However, his very first creation, the original Frankenstein monster, now calling himself Deucalion, is also alive and looking to kill his creator.

Cast
 Parker Posey as Detective Carson O'Conner
 Vincent Perez as Deucalion
 Thomas Kretschmann as Dr. Victor Helios
 Adam Goldberg as Detective Michael Sloane
 Ivana Miličević as Erika Helios
 Michael Madsen as Detective Harker
 Deborah Duke as Angelique
 Ann Mahoney as Jenna
 Deneen Tyler as Kathleen Burke
 Brett Rice as Detective Frye
 Stocker Fontelieu as Patrick

Production
Filming took place in New Orleans. Cinematographer Daniel Pearl shot on Kodak Super 16 mm film with Arriflex 16 SR3 cameras.

Reception
Sloan Freer of Radio Times gave the film two stars and said "though the ultra-stylised visuals create an air of brooding menace, they can't compensate for the patchy plotting or the abrupt and hugely unsatisfying finale." Brian Lowry of Variety praised the look saying "Even working on a made-for-TV budget, Nispel provides plenty of striking imagery, giving the film a truly distinctive look" and added "while the climax is somewhat disappointing, the brisk story until then leaves ample room to speculate as to where a series would go with Helios' creations roaming the Earth."

References

External links

2004 television films
2004 films
2004 horror films
2004 science fiction films
2000s American films
2000s English-language films
2000s police procedural films
2000s science fiction horror films
2000s serial killer films
American horror television films
American police detective films
American science fiction horror films
American science fiction television films
American serial killer films
Fictional portrayals of the New Orleans Police Department
Films based on adaptations
Films based on works by Dean Koontz
Films directed by Marcus Nispel
Films scored by Normand Corbeil
Films set in New Orleans
Films shot in New Orleans
Frankenstein films
Lionsgate films
Television films as pilots
Television films based on books
Television pilots not picked up as a series
USA Network original films